Lynette Robyn Warwick (born 21 October 1946) is a former Australian politician.

She was born in Cairns and worked as the Cairns regional manager of the National Heart Foundation before entering politics. A Liberal Party member who served as vice-chairman of her local branch, she was elected to the Queensland Legislative Assembly in 1995 as the member for Barron River. In 1997 she was appointed Parliamentary Secretary to the Joint Coalition parties, but in 1998 she lost her seat to the Labor member she had defeated in 1995.

References

1946 births
Living people
Liberal Party of Australia members of the Parliament of Queensland
Members of the Queensland Legislative Assembly
People from Cairns
Women members of the Queensland Legislative Assembly